The AI effect occurs when onlookers discount the behavior of an artificial intelligence program by arguing that it is not real intelligence.

Author Pamela McCorduck writes: "It's part of the history of the field of artificial intelligence that every time somebody figured out how to make a computer do something—play good checkers, solve simple but relatively informal problems—there was a chorus of critics to say, 'that's not thinking'." Researcher Rodney Brooks complains: "Every time we figure out a piece of it, it stops being magical; we say, 'Oh, that's just a computation.'"

Definition
"The AI effect" is that line of thinking, the tendency to redefine AI to mean: "AI is anything that has not been done yet." This is the common public misperception, that as soon as AI successfully solves a problem, that solution method is no longer within the domain of AI. Geist credits John McCarthy giving this phenomenon its name, the "AI effect".

McCorduck calls it an "odd paradox" that "practical AI successes, computational programs that actually achieved intelligent behavior, were soon assimilated into whatever application domain they were found to be useful in, and became silent partners alongside other problem-solving approaches, which left AI researchers to deal only with the 'failures', the tough nuts that couldn't yet be cracked."

 is:
"AI is whatever hasn't been done yet."
Larry Tesler
Douglas Hofstadter quotes this as do many other commentators.

When problems have not yet been formalised, they can still be characterised by a model of computation that includes human computation. The computational burden of a problem is split between a computer and a human: one part is solved by computer and the other part solved by a human. This formalisation is referred to as human-assisted Turing machine.

Similar terms
Various other terms are abbreviated "AI effect" which do not pertain to artificial intelligence. The magnitude of effect of a pesticide's active ingredient is important when considering a pesticide application. The magnitude of effect of agricultural intensification practices is also abbreviated this way. The magnitude of increase of a pharmaceutical due to micro-encapsulation affects decisions in pharmaceutical manufacturing.

AI applications become mainstream 

Software and algorithms developed by AI researchers are now integrated into many applications throughout the world, without really being called AI. This underappreciation is known from such diverse fields as computer chess, marketing, agricultural automation and hospitality.

Michael Swaine reports "AI advances are not trumpeted as artificial intelligence so much these days, but are often seen as advances in some other field". "AI has become more important as it has become less conspicuous", Patrick Winston says. "These days, it is hard to find a big system that does not work, in part, because of ideas developed or matured in the AI world."

According to Stottler Henke, "The great practical benefits of AI applications and even the existence of AI in many software products go largely unnoticed by many despite the already widespread use of AI techniques in software. This is the AI effect. Many marketing people don't use the term 'artificial intelligence' even when their company's products rely on some AI techniques. Why not?"

Marvin Minsky writes "This paradox resulted from the fact that whenever an AI research project made a useful new discovery, that product usually quickly spun off to form a new scientific or commercial specialty with its own distinctive name. These changes in name led outsiders to ask, Why do we see so little progress in the central field of artificial intelligence?"

Nick Bostrom observes that "A lot of cutting edge AI has filtered into general applications, often without being called AI because once something becomes useful enough and common enough it's not labelled AI anymore."

The AI effect on decision-making in supply chain risk management is a severely understudied area.

To avoid the AI effect problem, the editors of a special issue of IEEE Software on AI and software engineering recommend not overselling  not hyping  the real achievable results to start with.

The Bulletin of the Atomic Scientists organization views the AI effect as a worldwide strategic military threat. As they point out it obscures the fact that applications of AI had already found their way into both US and Soviet militaries during the Cold War. AI tools to advise humans regarding weapons deployment were even developed by both sides and received very limited usage during that time. They believe this constantly shifting failure to recognise AI continues to undermine human recognition of security threats in the present day.

Legacy of the AI winter 

Many AI researchers find that they can get more funding and sell more software if they avoid the bad name of "artificial intelligence" and instead pretend their work has nothing to do with intelligence at all. This was especially true in the early 1990s, during the second "AI winter".

Patty Tascarella writes "Some believe the word 'robotics' actually carries a stigma that hurts a company's chances at funding"

Saving a place for humanity at the top of the chain of being 
Michael Kearns suggests that "people subconsciously are trying to preserve for themselves some special role in the universe".
By discounting artificial intelligence people can continue to feel unique and special. Kearns argues that the change in perception known as the AI effect can be traced to the mystery being removed from the system. In being able to trace the cause of events implies that it's a form of automation rather than intelligence.

A related effect has been noted in the history of animal cognition and in consciousness studies, where every time a capacity formerly thought as uniquely human is discovered in animals, (e.g. the ability to make tools, or passing the mirror test), the overall importance of that capacity is deprecated.

Herbert A. Simon, when asked about the lack of AI's press coverage at the time, said, "What made AI different was that the very idea of it arouses a real fear and hostility in some human breasts. So you are getting very strong emotional reactions. But that's okay. We'll live with that."

Mueller 1987 proposed comparing AI to human intelligence, coining the standard of Human-Level Machine Intelligence. This nonetheless suffers from the AI effect however when different humans are used as the standard.

Deep Blue defeats Kasparov
When IBM's chess-playing computer Deep Blue succeeded in defeating Garry Kasparov in 1997, people complained that it had only used "brute force methods" and it wasn't real intelligence. Public perception of chess playing shifted from a difficult mental task to a routine operation. Fred A. Reed writes: "A problem that proponents of AI regularly face is this: When we know how a machine does something 'intelligent,' it ceases to be regarded as intelligent. If I beat the world's chess champion, I'd be regarded as highly bright." On the contrary, John McCarthy was disappointed by Deep Blue. He argued that it was merely a brute force machine and did not have any deep understanding of the game. However that is not to say that McCarthy generally dismissed AI. He was one of the founders of the field and invented the term "artificial intelligence". McCarthy lamented how widespread the AI effect is,
As soon as it works, no one calls it AI anymore
but merely did not feel that Deep Blue was a good example.

The future

Experts agree the AI effect certainly – or probably – will continue. Because technological development is a continual and unending process, the AI effect will also continue without end. Each advancement in AI will produce another objection and another redefinition of public expectations – ever expanding. While not addressing the AI effect directly, some writers have speculated the indefinite perpetuity of this phenomenon may be due to artificial intelligence itself, as Moore's law is.

The AI effect may grow to include dismissal of all specialised artificial intelligences. Instead the public perception of "artificial intelligence" may shift to only include those which are networks or collectives of multiple specialised AIs.

See also 
 No True Scotsman
 Chinese room
 ELIZA effect
 Functionalism (philosophy of mind)
 God of the gaps
 Hallucination (artificial intelligence)
 History of artificial intelligence
 Moravec's paradox
 Moving the goalposts

Notes

References

External links 
 "If It Works, It's Not AI: A Commercial Look at Artificial Intelligence startups"

Philosophy of artificial intelligence